Carl Walther GmbH Sportwaffen, or simply known as Walther, is a German firearm manufacturer, and a subsidiary of the PW Group. Founded by Carl Walther in 1886, the company has manufactured firearms and air guns at its facility in Germany for more than 100 years. Walther Arms, Inc. is the United States Walther business unit and is based in Fort Smith, Arkansas.

History 
The history of Walther started with the factory created by Matthias Conrad Pistor, the chief armorer of the Kassel Armory. Pistor is the ancestor of the Walther family. This plant was operating in 1780 and made pistols and other weapons. The granddaughter of Gustave Wilhelm Pistor married August Theodore Walther, whose son Carl Wilhelm Freund established the factory that employed apprentice Carl Walther. This small shop was established in 1886  in Zella-Mehlis, in what is today Thuringia. The company originally manufactured hunting and target rifles.
Then in 1888, he married Minna Georgine Pickert, daughter of Christian Friedrich Pickert, from the well-established revolver manufacturer "Arminius Waffenwerk", in the same town.

It was not until 1908 that, under the initiative of Fritz Walther, the oldest son of Carl Walther, they began to make pistols. Models 1 to 5 and 7 to 9 were in calibers .25 ACP (6.35mm) and .32 ACP (7.65mm). The Model 6 was Walther's first attempt at a 9mm Luger pistol. It used blowback rather than a locked breech and proved unsuccessful, with only around 1,000 made. Its rarity has made it highly sought after on the collectors market.

In 1929 Walther began to make the popular Walther PP Polizeipistole (police pistol) models. Walther followed this in 1931 with the first PPKs (Polizeipistole  Kriminalmodell, or Police Pistol Detective Model). Walther manufactured both PP and PPKs in .22 Long Rifle, .32 ACP (the most common caliber), .380 ACP and a minimal number in .25 ACP. The PP models were the first mass-produced pistols with stamped parts. Still, the overall increase in dependability and high production quality with lower relative manufacturing costs made them the best option to replace the P-08 Luger. In 1938, Nazi Germany awarded the contract for that replacement to Walther for the 9mm P38.

From 1942 until 1945, the company used slave labour at the Neuengamme concentration camp, and operated its own factory at the camp.

With his factory destroyed in World War II and Zella-Mehlis in the Soviet occupation zone, Walther was reduced to just a collection of designs and patents. Fritz Walther started anew and began manufacturing in Ulm, West Germany in 1953.
The company resumed production of the P38 (renamed the P1) in 1957 to equip the new West German Army, the Bundeswehr, with sidearms. When Fritz Walther died in December 1966, his son, Karl-Heinz, took over the company, concentrating on the sports sector.

In 1993, Umarex Sportwaffen (now part of PW Group) of Arnsberg, Germany, acquired Walther. It continued to manufacture under the Walther name in Ulm and Arnsberg. The German Walther company is known as Carl Walther Sportwaffen.

In 1999, the U.S.-based Smith & Wesson company became the authorized importer for Walther Firearms.
In 2012, the PW Group formed a new subsidiary, Walther Arms, Inc., located in Fort Smith, Arkansas, to take over the distribution of Walther arms in the United States.

Products

Handguns 

 Walther OSP
 Walther GSP
 Walther SSP
 Walther Olympia
 Walther SP22
 Walther Model 4
 Walther Model 8
 Walther Model 9
 Walther PP
 Walther PPK
 Walther P38
 Walther TPH
 Walther P1
 Walther P4
 Walther P5
 Walther P88/Compact
 Walther P99
 Walther P22
 Walther PDP
 Walther PPS
 Walther PK380
 Walther PPQ
 Walther Creed
 Walther Q5 Match
 Walther PPX
 Walther CCP
 Walther FP60
 Walther Q4 SF
 Walther WMP

Rifles, shotguns and submachine guns 

Submachine guns
 Walther MPK/MPL
Shotguns
 Walther automatic shotgun
Air Rifles
 Walther LGR
 Walther LGV
 Walther LG300
 Walther LG400
Firearm Rifles
 Gewehr 41
 Gewehr 43
 MKb 42(W)
 Walther G22
 Walther WA 2000

References

External links 

 Carl Walther, official German brand website (German).
 Carl Walther , official German brand website (English).
 Walther Arms, Inc., official U.S. brand website.

Arnsberg
Companies based in Baden-Württemberg
Companies based in North Rhine-Westphalia
Defence companies of Germany
Firearm manufacturers of Germany
Knife manufacturing companies
Neuengamme concentration camp
Ulm
Companies involved in the Holocaust